Jon Pelle (born March 29, 1986) is a retired American professional ice hockey player.

After four seasons in Harvard University, Pelle signed with the Frederikshavn White Hawks in Denmark in 2008, but was released after playing just twenty games. He finished the 2008-09 season with the Central Hockey League's Rapid City Rush and re-signed with the team for the 2009-10 season. He then moved to the United Kingdom in 2010 with the Cardiff Devils and in 2011 he signed with the Belfast Giants.

Awards and honors

References

External links

1986 births
Living people
Belfast Giants players
Cardiff Devils players
Frederikshavn White Hawks players
Harvard Crimson men's ice hockey players
Rapid City Rush players
People from West Islip, New York
Ice hockey players from New York (state)
American expatriate ice hockey players in Wales
American expatriate ice hockey players in Northern Ireland
American men's ice hockey forwards
American expatriate ice hockey players in Denmark